Komarno is a Hasidic dynasty founded by Rabbi Aleksander Sender Safrin (born 1770; died 28 August 1818 in Sátoraljaújhely, Hungary and is buried there) of Komarno, Ukraine.

Dynasty

Rabbi Aleksander Sender Eichenstein 
Rabbi Sender was the son of Rabbi Yitzchak Eisik Eichenstein (born 1740; died 26 February 1800) of the town of Safrin, from where Rabbi Sender's family name originates. He was a disciple of the Chozeh of Lublin and died at the age of 47 on a Saturday night, after spending Shabbos with the Yismach Moshe of Uhel. The Yismach Moshe appointed his kehilla to bury him in the Ohel (lit. tent) that was to be his very own burial place in Uhel.

Rabbi Yitzchak Eisik Safrin 
After the death of Rabbi Sender, his son, Rabbi Yitzchak Eisik Yehuda Yechiel Safrin (born 13 February 1806; died 28 April 1874), was raised by his uncle (his father's brother), Rabbi Tzvi Hirsh Eichenstein (born 1763; died 22 June 1831) of Zidichov.

Rabbi Yitzchak Eisik Yehuda Yechiel Safrin of Komarno, known as the Komarno Rebbe, was one of the most prolific expounders of the Teachings of the Baal Shem Tov, producing volumes of original insights on Jewish and Torah philosophy as inspired by the Baal Shem Tov, whom he calls "Mory V'Rabi" (my Teacher and inspirer), although the Baal Shem Tov died years before his birth. He also wrote insights on the Mishnah and Jewish Law. A hidden Torah Scholar for many years, he only later became known for his genius, piety and ability to work wonders. According to Hasidic legend, he showed a phenomenal ability as a child to foresee events happen before they did. His uncle and foster parent, Rabbi Hirsh of Zidichov, "removed" this talent from him and "hid" it from him to be used at an older more mature age. He was a giant among his generation and although he held positions that were in conflict with the Shulchan Aruch, he never held positions that were not based on the Rishonim and other accepted Talmudic or Zohar sources. Among his other works, Rebbe Yitzchak Eisik of Komarno's monumental commentaries Heichal HaBrachah on the Torah, Otzar HaChaim on the commandments, and Zohar Chai on the Zohar, are classics of Kabbalah as well as Hasidic philosophy.

 Rabbi Eisik of Komarno was succeeded as rebbe by his son, Rabbi Eliezer Tzvi Safrin of Komarno (born 1830; died 16 May 1898). Another son of Rabbi Eisik was Rabbi Alexander Sender Safrin.
 Rabbi Eliezer Zvi was succeeded as rebbe by his son, Rabbi Yaakov Moshe Safrin of Komarno (born 13 June 1861; died 23 July 1929). His son-in-law was Rabbi Chaim Elazar Spira of Munkacs (born 17 December 1871; died 11 May 1937).
Rabbi Yaakov Moshe was succeeded as rebbe by his son, Rabbi Sholom Safrin of Komarno (died May 1937), a son-in-law of Rabbi Yisrael Perlow of Stolin (born 24 November 1868; died 4 October 1921 in Frankfurt, Germany).
 Rabbi Sholom was succeeded as rebbe by his son, Rabbi Baruch Safrin (born 1913, perished 1943). He was the last rebbe to reside in Komarno. He was murdered in the Holocaust together with his whole community.
 Another son of Rabbi Eliezer Zvi was Rabbi Avraham Mordechai Safrin of Borislav. 
 Rabbi Avraham Mordechai was succeeded by his son, Rabbi Chaim Yankev Safrin. Rabbi Chaim Yankev emigrated to the United States before World War II. Rabbi Chaim Yankev was succeeded by his sons, 
Rabbi Sholom Safrin, Komarno rebbe in Jerusalem, Rabbi Sholom Safrin of Jerusalem was succeeded by his sons, 
Rabbi Nesanel Safrin, Komarno rebbe in Jerusalem and 
Rabbi Eliezer Tzvi Safrin, Komarno rebbe in Beit Shemesh. He is the author of the "Ohr Shivat HaYamim" commentary on the writings of the Baal Shem Tov. 
Rabbi Menachem Monish, Komarno rebbe in Bnei Brak, Rabbi Menachem Monish was succeeded by his sons, 
Rabbi Zvi El'azar, Komarno rebbe in Bnei Brak, and 
Rabbi Yitzhak Shlomo, Komarno rebbe in Jerusalem.
Rabbi Alter Yitzchok Elimelech Safrin, Komarno rebbe in the United States (died June 2016),
Rabbi Yissachar Dov Ber (died November 2006), also in Bnei Brak, and 
Rabbi Yehoshua Safrin in the United States.

References 

Jewish Galician (Eastern Europe) history
Hasidic Judaism in Ukraine